The Shrine of Meher Ali Shah is a 20th-century Sufi shrine that serves as the tomb of the Peer Meher Ali Shah, an early 20th-century Sufi scholar of the Chisti order, who was also a leader of the anti-Ahmadiya movement. The shrine is located within the Islamabad Capital Territory, in the village of Golra Sharif.

Nowadays, Golra Sharif is widely known for one of its custodians (Sajjada nashin) Pir Syed Naseer Uddin Naseer Gilani. The shrine's longest-serving Sajjada nashin was Peer Syed Shah Abdul Haq Gilani, the younger son of Babuji, who took care of the shrine for approximately 46 years (from 1974 to his death in July 2020). Presently, the shrine is managed by the heirs of both, Syed Ghulam Moinuddin Gilani and Syed Shah Abdul Haq Gilani.

Location
The mausoleum is situated in the village of Golra Sharif, foothills of Margalla in Sector E-11, in the Islamabad Capital Territory.

Construction
Peer Mehr Ali Shah died on 11 May 1937 and was succeeded by Babuji. The construction of the mausoleum took nearly twenty years to be fully completed. For this purpose, marble was brought from the Makrana mines in Jodhpur State.

See also
 List of cultural heritage sites in Islamabad Capital Territory
 List of cultural heritage sites in Pakistan
 List of mausolea and shrines in Pakistan
 Syed Ghulam Mohiyyuddin Gilani
 Syed Ghulam Moinuddin Gilani

References

External links

The Shrine's official website
Pir Ghulam Nizam-ud-din Jami Gilani
Mehr-e-Munir by Dr Muhammad Fadil Khan

Sufi shrines in Pakistan
Mausoleums in Pakistan
Sufism in Islamabad
Cultural heritage sites in Islamabad
Shrines in Pakistan